Kangarban, also rendered as Kankarban, may refer to:
 Kangarban-e Olya
 Kangarban-e Sofla
 Kangarban-e Vosta